CBS Portland can refer to:

KOIN, the CBS television affiliate in Portland, Oregon.
WGME-TV, the CBS television affiliate in Portland, Maine.